Bandpur is a village located in the Khekra tehsil of Indian Bagpat district.

It is located about 3.5 km from the New Delhi-Saharanpur highway. Nearby villages are Katha, Harchandpur, Bada Gaon and Sunehra. Bandpur is connected to Khekra by a road and is connected to Katha by a Khcha road (Kharanja). Sunehra is a station on the Delhi-Saharanpur railway Line.

Villages in Bagpat district